Frikkie is a given name. Notable people with the name include:

Frikkie Eloff (1925–2017), South African judge 
Frikkie Spies (born 1985), South African rugby union player
Frikkie Welsh (born 1978), South African rugby union player

Afrikaans-language given names
African masculine given names